Viktor Semchenkov (born 6 December 1942) is a Russian former swimmer. He competed in three events at the 1964 Summer Olympics for the Soviet Union.

References

External links
 

1942 births
Living people
Russian male swimmers
Olympic swimmers of the Soviet Union
Swimmers at the 1964 Summer Olympics
People from Norilsk
Soviet male swimmers
Sportspeople from Krasnoyarsk Krai